is the third studio album by the Japanese female idol group Shiritsu Ebisu Chugaku. The album was released on April 20, 2016 on the Sony Music Entertainment Japan's label SME Records.

The album was originally scheduled for release on February 10. However, in December 2015 group member Hinata Kashiwagi was diagnosed with sudden deafness, which lead to the album's release being postponed.

Background 
The album was released in 3 versions: a regular edition (CD-only) and two limited editions: the Limited Edition A (CD+Blu-ray) and the Limited Edition B (2CD). The limited editions and the first press of the regular version included a trading card (randomly selected from a set of 9 that includes a card for each member) as a bonus.

Track listing

CD

Blu-ray Disc (Limited Edition A only) 

Live Performance Filmed at Kishidan Banpaku on September 20, 2015.

CD2 (Limited Edition B only) 

Recorded live at Saitama Super Arena on December 12, 2015.

Personnel

Charts

Notes
All credits taken from the album insert.

References

External links 
 Anarchy special website
 Discography on the Shiritsu Ebisu Chugaku official site

Shiritsu Ebisu Chugaku albums
2016 albums
SME Records albums